Ajay Divecha (17 March 1940 – 12 October 1987) was an Indian cricketer. He played first-class cricket for Delhi, Maharashtra and Mumbai between 1960 and 1965.

See also
 List of Delhi cricketers

References

External links
 

1940 births
1987 deaths
Indian cricketers
Delhi cricketers
Maharashtra cricketers
Mumbai cricketers
Cricketers from Mumbai